Gerald White Johnson (1890 – March 22, 1980) was a journalist, editor, essayist, historian, biographer, and novelist. Over his career spanning more than seven decades, he was known for being "one of the most eloquent spokespersons for America's adversary culture." Johnson was an editorial writer for the Baltimore "Sunpapers" for nearly 20 years, a weekly columnist for The New Republic for 26 years, and the author of more than 30 books on American culture and politics. He wrote mystery novels under the pen name of Charles North.

Life and career
Johnson was born in Riverton, North Carolina, the son of an editor of a Baptist magazine. He graduated from Wake Forest College in 1910.

During World War I he was a member of the American Expeditionary Force. He was the first professor of journalism at the University of North Carolina. While there he published the first of many books, The Story of Man's Work, a defense of liberal capitalism. He opposed the anti-evolution movement during the "Monkey Trial" era.

Johnson worked for The Evening Sun of Baltimore from 1926 to 1943, when he retired to write for magazines and to concentrate on writing books.

In 1949 he served as the honorary chairman of a committee that advocated against loyalty oaths and in 1950 published an article in Harper's called "Why Communists are Valuable."

Johnson provided broadcast commentary in Baltimore for a few years in the 1950s.

He wrote many works on topics in American history, beginning with Andrew Jackson: An Epic in Homespun (1927).

He was a friend, colleague and protege of H. L. Mencken, although their philosophies differed.

He married Kathryn Hayward and they had two daughters. He died in Baltimore on March 22, 1980.

Works
The Undefeated (New York: Minton, Balch & Co., 1927). A book about Mt. Rushmore sculptor Gutzon Borglum's role in designing the Stone Mountain memorial in Georgia.
Randolph of Roanoke: A Political Fantastic (New York: Minton, Balch & Co., 1929)
 America's Silver Age: The Statecraft of Clay–Webster–Calhoun (New York, London, Harper & Bros., 1939)
Imperial Republic: Speculations on the Future, If Any, of the Third U.S.A.
Incredible Tale: The Odyssey of the Average American in the Last Half Century (Harper & Bros., 1950)
Roosevelt: Dictator or Democrat? (New York, London: Harper & Bros., 1941)
The Congress (Morrow, 1963)
The Cabinet (Morrow, 1966)
This American People (1951)
The First Captain: The Story of John Paul Jones. (NY: Coward-McCann, 1947)
Pattern for Liberty: The Story of Old Philadelphia (1952)
America is Born: A History for Peter (1959)
America Moves Forward: A History for Peter (Morrow, 1960)
America Grows Up: A History for Peter (Morrow, 1960)
Hod-carrier: Notes of a Laborer on an Unfinished Cathedral (1964)
Woodrow Wilson: The Unforgettable Figure who has Returned to Haunt Us(1944)
Communism an American View  (Morrow, 1964)
The Supreme Court (1968)
A Little Night Music (1945)
Andrew Jackson An Epic in Homespun (1927)
American Heroes and Hero-Worship (NY: Harper, 1943)
The Lines are Drawn: American Life since the First World War as Reflected in the Pulitzer Prize Cartoons (Lippincott, 1958)
The British Empire: An American View of its History from 1776 to 1945 (Morrow, 1969)
America-watching: Perspectives in the course of an incredible century  (1976)

Accolades
In 1952 Johnson received the Alfred I. duPont Award. In 1953, Johnson received the Peabody Award and The Hillman Prize.

References

Citations
Vincent Fitzpatrick, "Disturbing the Peace: Gerald W. Johnson In An Age of Conformity," Virginia Quarterly Review, Summer 2002, 427-38, available online, accessed December 12, 2010
Vincent Fitzpatrick, Gerald W. Johnson: From Southern Liberal to National Conscience'' (Louisiana State University Press, 2002)

External links 

 
Johnson, Gerald White at NCpedia

1890 births
1980 deaths
People from Robeson County, North Carolina